Adams High School may refer to several schools in the United States:

Adams Central High School, Monroe, Indiana
John Adams High School (Indiana), South Bend, Indiana
Rochester Adams High School, Rochester Hills, Michigan
Adams Central Junior-Senior High School, Hastings, Nebraska
John Adams High School (Queens), New York City, New York
John Adams High School (Ohio), Cleveland, Ohio
North Adams High School, Seaman, Ohio
Adams High School (Oregon), Portland, Oregon
Bryan Adams High School, Dallas, Texas

See also
Adams School (disambiguation)
Jane Addams High School (disambiguation)